The 2009 French motorcycle Grand Prix was the fourth round of the 2009 Grand Prix motorcycle racing season. It took place on the weekend of 15–17 May 2009 at the Bugatti Circuit in Le Mans, France. Jorge Lorenzo moved one point clear at the top of world championship standings after winning the MotoGP race ahead of Marco Melandri and Dani Pedrosa.

MotoGP classification

250 cc classification

125 cc classification

Championship standings after the race (MotoGP)
Below are the standings for the top five riders and constructors after round four has concluded.

Riders' Championship standings

Constructors' Championship standings

 Note: Only the top five positions are included for both sets of standings.

References

French motorcycle Grand Prix
French
Motorcycle Grand Prix
Motorcycle Grand Prix